A clip is a device that is used to store multiple rounds of ammunition together as a unit for insertion into the magazine or cylinder of a firearm. This speeds up the process by loading the firearm with several rounds at once, rather than one at a time ('loose rounds'). There are several types, most made of inexpensive stamped sheet metal, intended to be disposable, though they are often re-used.

Types

Stripper

A stripper clip (US) or charger (UK) is a speedloader that holds several cartridges as a unit for easier loading into a firearm's internal magazine. After the bolt is opened and the stripper clip is placed in position (generally in a slot on the receiver or bolt), the cartridges are pressed down, removing or 'stripping' them off the clip and into the magazine. The clip is then either removed and tossed away, or the bolt is thrown forward, expelling the clip automatically. However, some weapons, such as the Mosin–Nagant require the operator to manually remove the empty clip. Some weapons designed for stripper clip use include the Mannlicher M1894, Mauser C96, Roth–Steyr M1907, Lee-Enfield, Mosin-Nagant, Gewehr 98, M1903 Springfield, SKS, and Vz. 58. Detachable magazines may also be loaded with stripper clips provided they have a special guide attached, as in an M14 or M16.

En bloc

Several rifle designs utilize an en bloc clip for loading. With this design, both the cartridges and clip are inserted as a unit into a fixed magazine within the rifle, and the clip is usually ejected or falls from the rifle upon firing or chambering of the last round. The en bloc clip was invented by Ferdinand Mannlicher for use in his Model 1885, Model 1886 and 1888 rifles.

Other rifles utilizing en bloc clips include the German Gewehr 88 (since 1905 replaced by stripper clips), the Mexican Mondragón, the French Berthier Mle 1890 and RSC Mle 1917, the Italian M1870/87 Vetterli-Vitali and M1891 Carcano, the various (Romanian, Dutch, Portuguese) turnbolt Mannlichers, the Austro-Hungarian straight-pull Steyr-Mannlicher M1895, the Hungarian FÉG 35M, and the US M1895 Lee Navy, M1 Garand and Pedersen T1E3. Original Austrian Mannlicher clips were often uni-directional, but already the Gewehr 88 and subsequently the M1891 Carcano used symmetrical clips. John Pedersen at first developed an irreversible clip for his rifle, later he redesigned the clip to be reversible. This design was also utilized for the competing designs by John Garand.

Moon and half-moon

A moon clip is a ring-shaped or stellate piece of metal designed to hold a full cylinder of ammunition for a revolver (generally six rounds) together as a unit. Therefore, instead of loading or extracting one round at a time, a full cylinder of ammunition or spent cases can be loaded or extracted at once, speeding the loading process. A similar device known as a "half-moon clip" is semi-circular and designed to hold a half cylinder of ammunition (generally three rounds) in which case two clips are necessary to fully load the cylinder. Such devices have most often been used to chamber rimless semi-automatic pistol cartridges in a revolver, they can also be used for rimmed cartridges to allow for the faster loading and/or unloading of a revolver.

See also
Speedloader
Belt (firearms)
Glossary of firearms terms

References

External links
 How Does It Work: Clips! (Not Magazines) - Forgotten Weapons

Firearm components